Istria is a commune in Constanța County, Northern Dobruja, Romania.

It is located between the lower Danube and the Dobruja coast of the Black Sea. The ancient site of Histria is found nearby.

Villages in the Istria commune:
 Istria (historical names: Caranasuf)
 Nuntași (historical names: Duingi)

Demographics
At the 2011 census, Istria had 2,370 Romanians (99.54%), 6 Tatars (0.25%), 5 others (0.21%).

References

Communes in Constanța County
Localities in Northern Dobruja